The Morgan Plus 8 is a sports car built by British car maker Morgan from 1968 to 2004 and again in revised form between 2012 and 2018. Its instant and enduring popularity has been credited with saving the company and keeping the company famous during the 36 years of its manufacture. Among Morgan enthusiasts, it is deeply associated with Peter Morgan, the owner-chairman behind its design.

Design
The development of the Plus 8 was led by Maurice Owen, an engineer taken on specifically for the role. The Plus 8 prototype was based on a modified chassis from the Plus 4, altered to accept the Rover alloy block  V8, purchased from GM-Buick in 1967. Plus 4's Moss gearbox was carried over and the Salisbury 7HA axle was uprated with a limited-slip differential. The chassis was developed in stages to accommodate gearbox changes in 1973 and 1976, 1995 the body widened in 1976 to accommodate the widened chassis and the wings widened to accommodate larger tyres to handle the increasing power and trend for lower profile and wider tyres. To this day, early Plus 8s are the prereenial winners in that 1960-1970 class in the UK.

In 2002/2, Morgan created a "LeMans Edition" with similar exterior feature to the 1960s Plus 4 LeMans winner.

In 2003, Morgan created a 35th year "Anniversary Edition" of the Plus 8.

Following the discontinuation of the Rover V8, production of Plus 8 ended in 2004. A revised Aero, powered by a 4.8-litre BMW V8 engine, was placed on an Aero chassis, with Aero 8 suspension, axles, brakes, steering, gearbox, and altered wings *was introduced in 2012, They also called this model "Plus 8" and it was sold concurrently with the Aero 8 from that date until the elimination of the Aero line-up in 2020.

In 2014 Morgan created another edition called the Plus 8 'Speedster' models based on the later Aero configuration noted above. It began as a limited edition, but production was not limited to then60m originally advertised. This limited run forwent the traditional roof in favour of a small fly screen and hidden roll bars behind the front seats. Pitched as an entry level Plus 8 model they went on sale for £69,999.

In 2021, Morgan announced another limited edition run of 10 Plus 8 'GTR' models painted to look like the two Morgan racers (both called "Big Blues"), though the original Big Blue had the Rover V8 configuration and equipment, but were powered by Corvette engines.

Engines

The original Plus 8 engines were Rover V8s that became available when fitted to the P5B saloon. Morgan was actually the first of a succession of sports car makers- including the likes of TVR and Marcos- to use the engine.

The prototype Plus 8 (identifiable by two small bonnet bulges near the centre bonnet hinge) used a Buick 215 V8 engine but the production Plus 8 was launched in 1968 using Rover's production engine, a re-engineered version of the Buick 215 motor (renamed the 3.5 L by Rover) with a compression of 10.5:1 originally fuelled by two SU HS6 carburettors. The high 10.5:1 CR was only usable because 5* (101 octane) petrol was then still available. By 1973, the Rover 3500 saloon was available with a manual 4 speed gearbox and this engine/gearbox configuration was adopted by Morgan although the compression dropped to 9.25:1 with a resulting drop in power. With the adoption of an improved version of the engine developed for the Rover SD1 in 1977, compression increased to 9.35:1 and power increased slightly. After 1981 the engine was fueled by two Stromberg CD175 carburettors, which increased the power as the SUs were not a perfect match for the engine. There is a substantial leap in power if the earlier mentioned carbs are swapped out for a Holley 390 or preferably, a Weber/Edlebrock/Carter 500.

At the end of 1983, the company offered an EFI version using a Bosch L-Jetronic based system. However, power kept dropping from then until the end of production in 2004. In 1990 a 3.9 L version of the engine was fitted and that used the Lucas 14CUX fuel injection system. All Rover/LR Plus 8 versions between 1976 (Sd1)and GEMS are very easy to upgrade to much greater power. They can draw on the British, American and Australian aftermarkets. Very popular engines with easy parts or upgrades sourcing.

In 1996, the Rover 4.6 L engine became an option, still using the Lucas 14CU fuel injection system. From 1998 the overseas model began to use the GEMS fuelling system and by 2000 all Morgan Plus 8s were fuelled by the GEMS system as used on the Range Rover P38a between 1994 and 1999.

On the 2012 Geneva Motor Show, Morgan introduced a new edition of the Plus 8 roadster, powered by a 4.8L BMW V8-Engine. At the same show, Morgan also introduced an electric version of the Plus 8 roadster - called the Plus E - which is powered by a Zytek 70 kW (94 bhp) 300Nm electric motor.

United States sales
For almost two decades during the 1950s and 1960s, North America took the greater bulk of Morgan production. Popularity in the UK and Europe had greatly fallen during that era. The era ended with the advent of the strong emission and structural laws. Luckily, the failure of the modern looking +4+ and the arrival of the powerful Plus 8 rekindled interest in the home market in the whole line.

In the US, a way was found to keep importing Morgans after 1974. From 1974 to 1992, all imported Morgans (of which 98% were Plus 8s) to the United States were converted to run on propane as fuel to pass the U.S. emissions regulations.

When the Rover Group re-certified their V-8 engine for use in the Range Rover SUV sold in the U.S., Morgan made a gasoline-powered +8 available with the same engine in the same tune and with the same anti-emission devices. As safety regulations continue to change, Morgan was again challenged in 2006 to meet the new structural requirements announced by the NHTSA in 2000. A request for an exemption to the law on airbags was refused and the importation of traditional (classic) Morgans ceased.

Gearboxes

1968–72 Moss gearbox, a 4-speed manual transmission with synchromesh 2nd, 3rd, and 4th
1972–77 Rover 3500s, 4-speed all-synchromesh manual transmission used in the Rover 3500S saloon
1977–95 Rover LT77, 5-speed all-synchromesh manual transmission
1995–2004 Rover R380, 5-speed all-synchromesh manual transmission
2012 6-speed manual transmission (6-speed automatic transmission optional)

Gallery

References

External links 

GoMoG Workshop Manual
Motor Trend
Gentleman's Quarterly

Plus 8
Cars introduced in 1968
Retro-style automobiles
Roadsters
Group 4 (racing) cars
1970s cars
1980s cars
1990s cars
2000s cars
2010s cars